Cercle Athlétique Pontarlier is a French association football team founded in 1911. They are based in Pontarlier, Franche-Comté, France and as of the 2019–20 season they are playing in the Championnat National 3, the fifthtier in the French football league system. They play at the Stade Paul Robbe in Pontarlier.

Current squad

References

External links
  

Association football clubs established in 1911
1911 establishments in France
Sport in Doubs
Football clubs in Bourgogne-Franche-Comté